Robert H. Burris (April 13, 1914 – May 11, 2010) was a professor in the Biochemistry Department at the University of Wisconsin-Madison. He was elected to the National Academy of Sciences in 1961. Research in Burris's lab focused on enzyme reaction mechanisms, and he made significant contributions to our knowledge of nitrogen fixation.

Education
Born in Brookings, South Dakota, Burris earned his B.S. degree in chemistry at South Dakota State University in 1936 and his Ph.D. from the University of Wisconsin-Madison in 1940.

Career
He did postdoctoral research with Harold Urey at Columbia University, and later moved back to Madison, eventually becoming a professor in the Biochemistry Department. He was chairman of the department from 1958 to 1970. He retired from active research in 1984, having trained more than 70 doctoral research students.

He died in 2010 aged 96.

Awards and distinctions
1961 – Elected to the National Academy of Sciences
1975 – Fellow of the American Academy of Arts and Sciences
1979 – Member of the American Philosophical Society
1979 – National Medal of Science
1984 – John J. Carty Award of the National Academy of Sciences in agricultural science
1985 – Wolf Award in agriculture
1989 – Kenneth A. Spencer Award for Meritorious Achievement in Agricultural and Food Chemistry
 Recognized as a Pioneer Member of the American Society of Plant Biologists.

References

1914 births
2010 deaths
American biochemists
Members of the United States National Academy of Sciences
University of Wisconsin–Madison faculty
South Dakota State University alumni
University of Wisconsin–Madison alumni
National Medal of Science laureates
Wolf Prize in Agriculture laureates
Fellows of the American Academy of Arts and Sciences
People from Brookings, South Dakota
Members of the American Philosophical Society